Bir Mangaoli is a village in Thanesar subdistrict in Kurukshetra district of Haryana, India.

Reference 

Villages in Kurukshetra district